The Phnom Penh Hotel is a hotel in Phnom Penh, Cambodia. It has over 400 rooms and is located along Monivong Boulevard in the Central Business District of the city.

The hotel has a number of notable restaurants including Le Palace Chinese Restaurant, the Little Sheep Hot Pot Restaurant which serves a selection of meats and seafood  and the Zen Japanese Restaurant which specialised in Sushi.

External links
Official site

Buildings and structures in Phnom Penh
Hotels in Cambodia